Abū Ḥātim Aḥmad ibn Ḥamdān al-Rāzī was a Persian Ismaili philosopher of the 9th century, who died in 322 AH (935 CE). He was also the Da'i al-du'at (chief missionary) of Ray and the leader of the Ismaili da'wah in Central Persia.

Life

He was born in Rayy near modern Tehran. He was a contemporary of Muhammad ibn Zakariya al-Razi and engaged in debates with him.

Works

 Al-Jāmiʿ, a book on jurisprudence.
 Kitāb aʿlām al-nubuwwa (The Proofs of Prophecy), a refutation of Abū Bakr al-Rāzī.
 Kitāb al-Iṣlāḥ (Book of the Correction), “the oldest extant Ismāʾilī work presenting a Neoplatonic world-view.” Written as a corrective to the views of his contemporary Muḥammad ibn Aḥmad al-Nasafī.
 Kitāb al-Zīna (Book of the Ornament), on the superiority of the Arabic language and on religious terminology.

Bibliography 
 Brion, Fabienne, “Philosophie et révélation : traduction annotée de six extraits du Kitâb A'lâm an-nubûwa d'Abû Hâtim ar-Râzî”, Bulletin de philosophie médiévale 28, 1986, p. 137-162.
 Brion, Fabienne, “Le temps, l'espace et la genèse du monde selon Abû Bakr al-Râzî. Présentation et traduction des chapitres I, 3 du « Kitâb a'lâm al-nubuwwa » d'Abû Hâtim al-Râzî”, Revue philosophique de Louvain, tome 87, n°74, 1989, p. 139-164.
 Khalidi, Tarif, parallel Arabic-English edition of Kitāb aʾlām al-nubuwwa (The Proofs of Prophecy), Brigham Young University Press, 2012, Islamic Translation Series.
 Vajda, Georges, “Les lettres et les sons de la langue arabe d'après Abû Hâtim al-Râzî”, Arabica 8, 1961, p. 113-180.

Notes

References

Islamic philosophers
Iranian Ismailis
Ismaili da'is
People from Ray, Iran
9th-century Iranian people
10th-century Iranian philosophers
322 deaths
10th-century Ismailis